Nausicaá Centre National de la Mer is a public aquarium located in Boulogne-sur-Mer in northern France. It is the largest public aquarium of Europe.

Nausicaa is described as a centre of scientific and technical discovery of the marine environment, focusing primarily on the relationship between man and the sea.

History

The idea for the aquarium started when Guy Lengagne, then mayor of Boulogne-sur-Mer, wanted to repurpose an old casino. In 1982, oceanographers Philippe Vallette, Stéphane Henard, and Christophe Liacopoulos were tasked with a preliminary study, and eventually with implementing the project.

In 1984 a non-profit association was created for the aquarium, and Jacques Rougerie was selected as architect for the facility. In 1986 France selected the project as one of its major urban development projects and it was renamed the National Sea Centre. The European Union contributed half of the FF140 million required to finance the project, and bids to build the project were solicited.

Construction started in 1987 and was finished by early 1991 when the National Sea Centre Development Company was created. The centre was renamed again to Nausicaa (a Homeric princess from Greek mythology), and was opened on 18 May 1991. The first jellyfish arrived at the aquarium in 1994, and the first temporary exhibition, “The Sea and the Child,” was opened in 1995.  The entrance hall is embellished by the large scale painting Corrida (The Matador) by Pascal Lecocq.

In 1999, Nausicaa was designated a Centre of Excellence by the UNESCO Intergovernmental Oceanographic Commission for its outreach programmes. In 2002 it obtained the "Tourism & Disability" label, and the World Ocean Network was created.

2003 saw the arrival of the first spectacled caimans in the Submerged Tropical Forest. This space was incorporated into the  “World House” in early 2005, which aims to make people think about their consumer habits. In 2006 another expansion added space for a permanent exhibition called “Steer South.” The aquarium welcomed its first African penguins, though its first penguin hatching was not until 2010.

In 2007, Nausicaa welcomed its ten millionth visitor. In 2008, it opened a new interactive multimedia exhibit called “Planet Nausicaa,” as well as exhibitions that focus on Madagascar and the Mozambique Canal.  

In 2018, the largest expansion for Nausicaa in its history happened with a large new gallery named "The High Seas". This new gallery includes a huge  tank for pelagic fish. Meanwhile, the original exhibits have been grouped into a gallery known as "Mankind and Shores".

Exhibits

Shark Aquarium
Tropical Lagoon
Sea Lion Reserve
Tactile Pool
World Ocean
Submerged Forest
Penguin Beach

With "The High Sea" expansion that opened in 2018, the exhibit area tripled in size. "The High Sea" is centered on the huge  tank for large pelagic fish such as manta rays, oceanic sunfish and scalloped hammerheads.

Animal medicine

In October 2008, Nausicaa worked with a veterinary surgeon who specialises in sharks for the first successful surgery on a grey nurse shark. On 14 November 2008, Nausicaa was awarded first prize for medical training in the care of sea lions at the IMATA (International Marine Animal Trainers Association) annual conference, which took place in Cancun, Mexico.

Conservation

The aquarium is part of the European “Mr Goodfish” campaign (launched in France in 2010) in association with the Acquario di Genova in Italy and the Aquarium Finisterrae in Spain, under the aegis of the World Ocean Network. This project tries to encourage people to take an active part in preserving marine resources.

Several books have been published by the aquarium, including “Secrets des abysses” by Christine Causse and Philippe Vallette published by Fleurus, and “Madagascar, L’ile Océan” by Christine Causse and Philippe Vallette, photographs by Alexis Rosenfeld, published by Autrement.

Notes

Notes

External links

Aquaria in France
Boulogne-sur-Mer
Buildings and structures in Pas-de-Calais
Tourist attractions in Hauts-de-France
Tourist attractions in Pas-de-Calais
Organizations based in Hauts-de-France